Gaston Rakotobezanahary is a Malagasy politician. A member of the National Assembly of Madagascar, he was elected as a member of the Liaraike party; he represents the constituency of Benenitra.

References
Profile on National Assembly site 

Year of birth missing (living people)
Living people
Members of the National Assembly (Madagascar)
Liaraike politicians
Place of birth missing (living people)